Riton may refer to:

 Riton (musician) (born 1978), recording name of electronic musician Henry Smithson
 Riton (duet), a Bulgarian pop duet,
 Riton Liebman (born 1964), Belgian comedian, actor and director
 Lutfor Rahman Riton, Bangladeshi writer

See also 
 Rhyton, a drinking vessel
 Rhyton (band), American band